Football in Burundi has been affected by the civil war that broke out in Burundi. Before that, Burundi football had been doing well. Football is the most popular sport in Burundi.

The football club Vital'O reached the final of the most prestigious African competition; Inter FC and reached the semifinals.

Just two nights before the war broke out in Burundi, the national team was in Guinea to play the host in the second leg of the playoffs to qualify for the African Nations Cup. The Burundian youth team reached the semi final of the African Nations Youth Cup as well as qualifying in the World Youth Championship in Qatar.

In the Homeless World Cup, Burundi won the 2006 INSP Trophy, defeating Argentina in the final.

Mohammed Tchité is the most famous Burundian footballer.

League system

Women's football
Women's football in Burundi is growing in the country.

Football venues in Burundi

References